Cloud Quarry was a quarry near Temple Cloud, in the limestone of the Mendip Hills, in Somerset, England.

During World War II a factory was built in the disused quarry to make tyres for the Avro Lancaster Bomber. The roof was painted blue in an attempt to fool German bombers. The factory is now used for light industry and workshops including a trapeze school.

See also 
 Quarries of the Mendip Hills

References 

Quarries in the Mendip Hills